Irena Tanova (born August 2, 1984 in Stara zagora) is a Bulgarian sport shooter. Tanova represented Bulgaria at the 2008 Summer Olympics in Beijing, where she competed in two pistol shooting events.  She placed thirty-second out of forty-four shooters in the women's 10 m air pistol, with a total score of 377 points. Three days later, Tanova competed for her second event, 25 m pistol, where she was able to shoot 280 targets in the precision stage, and 289 in the rapid fire, for a total score of 569 points, finishing only in thirty-seventh place.

References

External links
NBC 2008 Olympics profile

Bulgarian female sport shooters
Living people
Olympic shooters of Bulgaria
Shooters at the 2008 Summer Olympics
Sportspeople from Stara Zagora
1984 births
21st-century Bulgarian women